A supersonic aircraft is an aircraft which can exceed the speed of sound (Mach 1.0) in level flight.

|-
| Aeritalia F-104S || Italy || Turbojet || Fighter || 1966 || Production || 246 || Interceptor 
|-
| AIDC F-CK-1 Ching-kuo || Taiwan || Turbofan || Fighter || 1989 || Production || 137 || 
|-
| AIDC T-5 Brave Eagle || Taiwan || Turbofan || Trainer || 2020 || Production || 4 || 
|-
| Atlas Cheetah || South Africa || Turbojet || Fighter || 1986 || Production || 60 || 
|-
| Avro Canada CF-105 Arrow || Canada || Turbojet || Fighter || 1958 || Prototype ||  5 || Interceptor 
|-
| BAC 221 || United Kingdom || Turbojet || Experimental || 1964 || Prototype || 1 || Fairey Delta 2 adapted to test the ogival delta wing for Concorde.
|-
| BAC TSR-2 || United Kingdom || Turbojet || Attack || 1964 || Prototype || 1 || Tactical Strike/Reconnaissance (TSR)
|-
| Bell X-1 || United States || Rocket || Experimental || 1947 || Prototype || 7 || First supersonic aircraft.
|-
| Bell X-2 || United States || Rocket || Experimental || 1952 || Prototype || 2 || 
|-
| Boeing X-32 || United States || V/STOL || Experimental || 2000 || Prototype || 2 || 
|-
| Boeing F/A-18E/F Super Hornet || United States || Turbofan || Multirole || 1995 || Production || 608 || 
|-
| Boeing EA-18G Growler || United States || Turbofan || Patrol || 2004 || Production || 172 || Electronic warfare (EW)
|-
| Bristol 188 || United Kingdom || Turbojet || Experimental || 1962 || Prototype || 2  || 
|-
| British Aerospace EAP || United Kingdom || Turbofan || Experimental || 1986 || Prototype || 1 || Developed into the Eurofighter Typhoon
|-
| CAC/PAC JF-17 Thunder || Multi-National || Turbofan || Multirole || 2003 || Production || 164 || Pakistan-China
|-
| Chengdu J-7 || China || Turbojet || Fighter || 1966 || Production || 2400 || 
|-
| Chengdu J-10 || China || Turbofan || Multirole || 1998 || Production || 548 || 
|-
| Chengdu J-20 || China || Turbofan || Fighter || 2011 || Production || 50 || 
|-
| Concorde || Multi-National || Turbojet || Transport || 1969 || Production || 20 || SST. Anglo-French
|-
| Convair B-58 Hustler || United States || Turbojet || Bomber || 1956 || Production || 116 || Strategic. 
|-
| Convair F-102 Delta Dagger || United States || Turbojet || Fighter || 1953 || Production || 992 || Interceptor 
|-
| Convair F2Y Sea Dart || United States || Turbojet || Fighter || 1953 || Prototype || 5 || Seaplane. Interceptor 
|-
| Convair F-106 Delta Dart || United States || Turbojet || Fighter || 1959 || Production || 340 || Interceptor 
|-
| Dassault MD.550 Mirage || France || Turbojet || Fighter || 1956 || Prototype || 1 || Interceptor 
|-
| Dassault Mirage III || France || Turbojet || Fighter || 1958 || Production || 1422 || Interceptor. Active only in Pakistan Air Force
|-
| Dassault Mirage IIIV || France || V/STOL || Fighter || 1965 || Prototype || 2 ||
|-
| Dassault Mirage IV || France || Turbojet || Bomber || 1959 || Production || 66 || Strategic nuclear. 
|-
| Dassault Mirage 5 || France || Turbojet || Attack || 1967 || Production || 582 ||
|-
| Dassault Mirage F1 || France || Turbojet || Fighter || 1966 || Production || 720 || 
|-
| Dassault Mirage F2 || France || Turbofan || Attack || 1966 || Prototype || 1 || 
|-
| Dassault Mirage G || France || Turbojet || Multirole || 1967 || Prototype || 3 || 
|-
| Dassault Mirage 2000 || France || Turbofan || Fighter || 1978 || Production || 601 || 
|-
| Dassault Mirage 4000 || France || Turbofan || Fighter || 1979 || Prototype || 1 || 
|-
| Dassault Rafale || France || Turbofan || Multirole || 1986 || Production || 240 || 
|-
| Dassault-Breguet Super Étendard || France || Turbojet || Attack || 1974 || Production || 85 || 
|-
| Dassault Super Mystère || France || Turbojet || Multirole || 1955 || Production || 180 || 
|-
| Douglas D-558-2 Skyrocket || United States || Rocket || Experimental || 1948 || Prototype || 3 || Dual jet and rocket powerplants,
|-
| Douglas X-3 Stiletto || United States || Turbojet || Experimental || 1951 || Prototype || 1 || 
|-
| English Electric Lightning || United Kingdom || Turbojet || Fighter || 1957 || Production || 337 || Interceptor 
|-
| Eurofighter Typhoon || Multi-National || Turbofan || Fighter || 1994 || Production || 661 || 
|-
| EWR VJ 101 || West Germany || V/STOL || Fighter || 1963 || Prototype || 2 || 
|-
| Fairey Delta 2 || United Kingdom || Turbojet || Experimental || 1954 || Prototype || 2 || First aircraft to pass 1,000 mph.
|-
| General Dynamics F-16 Fighting Falcon || United States || Turbofan || Fighter || 1974 || Production || 4604 || 
|-
| General Dynamics F-111 Aardvark || United States || Turbofan || Fighter || 1964 || Production || 563 || Also bomber and EW Variants.
|-
| Grumman F-11 Tiger || United States || Turbojet || Fighter || 1954 || Production || 200 || 
|-
| Grumman F11F-1F Super Tiger || United States || Turbojet || Fighter || 1956 || Prototype || 2 || 
|-
| Grumman F-14 Tomcat || United States || Turbofan || Fighter || 1970 || Production || 712 || 
|-
| Guizhou JL-9 || China || Turbojet || Trainer || 2003 || Production ||  || 
|-
| HAL Tejas || India || Turbofan || Multirole || 2001 || Production || 40 || 
|-
| Helwan HA-300 || Egypt || Turbojet || Fighter || 1964 || Prototype || 3 || Interceptor 
|-
| HESA Azarakhsh || Iran || Turbojet || Fighter || 1997 || Prototype || 6 || 
|-
| HESA Saeqeh || Iran || Turbojet || Fighter || 2004 || Production || 12 || 
|-
| Hongdu L-15 || China || Turbofan || Trainer || 2005 || Prototype ||  ||
|-
| IAI Kfir || Israel || Turbojet || Multirole || 1973 || Production || 220 || 
|-
| IAI Lavi || Israel || Turbofan || Multirole || 1986 || Prototype || 3 || 
|-
| IAI Nammer || Israel || Turbofan || Fighter || 1991 || Prototype || 1 || 
|-
| IAI Nesher || Israel || Turbojet || Multirole || 1971 || Production || 61 || 
|-
| KAI T-50 Golden Eagle || Republic of Korea || Turbofan || Trainer || 2002 || Production || 200 || 
|-
| Lockheed A-12 || United States || Turbojet || Patrol || 1962 || Production || 15 || Hybrid turbojet-ramjet engines. Reconnaissance
|-
| Lockheed SR-71 Blackbird || United States || Turbojet || Patrol || 1964 || Production || 32 || Hybrid turbojet-ramjet engines. Reconnaissance
|-
| Lockheed YF-12 || United States || Turbojet || Fighter || 1963 || Prototype || 3 || Interceptor
|-
| Lockheed Martin F-22 Raptor || United States || Turbofan || Fighter || 1997 || Production || 195 || 
|-
| Lockheed Martin F-35 Lightning II || United States || Turbofan || Multirole || 2006 || Production || 820 || 
|-
| Lockheed F-104 Starfighter || United States || Turbojet || Fighter || 1954 || Production || 2578 ||Interceptor 
|-
| Lockheed Martin X-35 || United States || Turbofan || Experimental || 2000 || Prototype || 2 || 
|-
| Martin Marietta X-24A || United States || Rocket || Experimental || 1969 || Prototype || 1 || 
|-
| McDonnell F-101 Voodoo || United States || Turbojet || Fighter || 1954 || Production || 807 || 
|-
| McDonnell Douglas F-4 Phantom II  || United States || Turbojet || Multirole || 1958 || Production || 5195 || 
|-
| McDonnell Douglas F-15 Eagle || United States || Turbofan || Fighter || 1972 || Production || 1723 || F-15E Strike Eagle multirole variant
|-
| McDonnell Douglas F/A-18 Hornet || United States || Turbofan || Multirole || 1978 || Production || 1480 || 
|-
| Mikoyan-Gurevich MiG-19 || Soviet Union || Turbojet || Fighter || 1953 || Production || 2172 || 
|-
| Mikoyan-Gurevich MiG-21 || Soviet Union || Turbojet || Fighter || 1955 || Production || 11496 || 
|-
| Mikoyan-Gurevich MiG-23 || Soviet Union || Turbojet || Fighter || 1967 || Production || 5047 || 
|-
| Mikoyan-Gurevich MiG-25 || Soviet Union || Turbojet || Fighter || 1964 || Production || 1186 || Interceptor 
|-
| Mikoyan MiG-27 || Soviet Union || Turbojet || Attack || 1970 || Production || 1075 || 
|-
| Mikoyan-Gurevich MiG-29 || Soviet Union || Turbofan || Fighter || 1977 || Production || 1600 || 
|-
| Mikoyan MiG-31 || Soviet Union || Turbofan || Fighter || 1975 || Production || 519 || Interceptor 
|-
| Mikoyan MiG-35 || Russia || Turbofan || Fighter || 2007 || Prototype || 8 || 
|-
| Mikoyan Project 1.44 || Russia || Turbofan || Experimental || 2000 || Prototype || 1 || 
|-
| Mitsubishi F-1 || Japan || Turbofan || Fighter || 1971 || Production || 77 || 
|-
| Mitsubishi F-2 || Japan || Turbofan || Multirole || 1995 || Production || 98 || 
|-
| Mitsubishi T-2 || Japan || Turbofan || Trainer || 1975 || Production || 90 || 
|-
| Mitsubishi X-2 Shinshin || Japan || Turbofan || Experimental || 2016 || Prototype || 1 || 
|-
| Myasishchev M-50 || Soviet Union || Turbojet || Bomber || 1959 || Prototype || 1 || 
|-
| Nanchang J-12 || China || Turbojet || Fighter || 1970 || Prototype || 8 || 
|-
| Nanchang Q-5 || China || Turbojet || Attack || 1965 || Production || 1300 || 
|-
| Nord Gerfaut || France || Turbojet || Experimental || 1953 || Prototype || 2 || 
|-
| Nord Griffon || France || Turbojet || Experimental || 1955 || Prototype || 2 || Dual turbojet-ramjet powerplant
|-
| North American A-5 Vigilante || United States || Turbojet || Fighter || 1958 || Production || 120 || Interceptor 
|-
| North American F-100 Super Sabre || United States || Turbojet || Fighter || 1953 || Production || 2294 || 
|-
| North American F-107 || United States || Turbojet || Attack || 1957 || Prototype || 3 || 
|-
| North American X-15 || United States || Rocket || Experimental || 1959 || Prototype || 3 ||
|-
| North American XB-70 Valkyrie || United States || Turbojet || Bomber || 1964 || Prototype || 2 || Strategic bomber
|-
| Northrop F-5 || United States || Turbojet || Fighter || 1959 || Production || 2603 || 
|-
| Northrop T-38 Talon || United States || Turbojet || Trainer || 1959 || Production || 1189 || 
|-
| Northrop HL-10 || United States || Rocket || Experimental || 1966 || Prototype || 1 || 
|-
| Northrop M2-F3 || United States || Rocket || Experimental || 1970 || Prototype || 1 || 
|-
| Northrop YF-17 || United States || Turbojet || Fighter || 1974 || Prototype || 2 || 
|-
| Northrop F-20 Tigershark || United States || Turbofan || Fighter || 1982 || Prototype || 3 || 
|-
| Northrop YF-23 || United States || Turbofan || Fighter || 1990 || Prototype || 2 || 
|-
| Panavia Tornado || Multi-National || Turbofan || Multirole || 1974 || Production || 992 || 
|-
| Republic XF-91 Thunderceptor || United States || Turbojet || Fighter || 1949 || Prototype || 2 || Interceptor 
|-
| Republic F-105 Thunderchief || United States || Turbojet || Attack || 1955 || Production || 833 || 
|-
| Rockwell B-1 Lancer || United States || Turbofan || Bomber || 1974 || Production || 104 || Strategic bomber
|-
| Rockwell-MBB X-31 || United States || Turbofan || Experimental || 1990 || Prototype || 2 || 
|-
| Saab 35 Draken || Sweden || Turbojet || Fighter || 1955 || Production || 651 || 
|-
| Saab 37 Viggen || Sweden || Turbofan || Fighter || 1967 || Production || 329 || 
|-
| Saab JAS 39 Gripen || Sweden || Turbofan || Multirole || 1988 || Production || 271 || 
|-
| Saunders-Roe SR.53 || United Kingdom || Rocket || Fighter || 1957 || Prototype || 2 || Interceptor. Mixed powerplant (jet + rocket)
|-
| SEPECAT Jaguar || Multi-National || Turbofan || Attack || 1968 || Production || 543 || 
|-
| Shenyang J-6 || China || Turbojet || Fighter || 1958 || Production || 4500 || 
|-
| Shenyang J-8 || China || Turbojet || Fighter || 1969 || Production || 408 || Interceptor 
|-
| Shenyang J-11 || China || Turbofan || Fighter || 1998 || Production || 440 || 
|-
| Shenyang J-15 || China || Turbofan || Fighter || 2009 || Production || 50 || 
|-
| Shenyang J-16 || China || Turbofan || Multirole || 2012 || Production || 172 || 
|-
| Shenyang J-31 || China || Turbofan || Multirole || 2012 || Prototype ||  || 
|-
| Sukhoi Su-7 || Soviet Union || Turbojet || Fighter || 1955 || Production || 1847 || 
|-
| Sukhoi Su-9 || Soviet Union || Turbojet || Fighter || 1956 || Production || 1150 || Interceptor 
|-
| Sukhoi Su-11 || Soviet Union || Turbojet || Fighter || 1958 || Production || 108 || Interceptor 
|-
| Sukhoi Su-15 || Soviet Union || Turbojet || Fighter || 1962 || Production || 1290 || Interceptor 
|-
| Sukhoi Su-17 || Soviet Union || Turbojet || Attack || 1966 || Production || 2867 || 
|-
| Sukhoi Su-24 || Soviet Union || Turbojet || Attack || 1967 || Production || 1400 || 
|-
| Sukhoi Su-27 || Soviet Union || Turbofan || Fighter || 1977 || Production || 680 || 
|-
| Sukhoi Su-30 || Soviet Union || Turbofan || Multirole || 1989 || Production || 630 || 
|-
| Sukhoi Su-33 || Soviet Union || Turbofan || Fighter || 1987 || Production || 35 || 
|-
| Sukhoi Su-34 || Soviet Union || Turbofan || Attack || 1990 || Production || 147 || 
|-
| Sukhoi Su-35 || Russia || Turbofan || Multirole || 2008 || Production || 154 ||
|-
| Sukhoi Su-37 || Russia || Turbofan || Fighter || 1996 || Prototype || 1 || 
|-
| Sukhoi Su-47 || Russia || Turbofan || Fighter || 1997 || Prototype || 1 || 
|-
| Sukhoi Su-57 || Russia || Turbofan || Fighter || 2010 || Prototype || 16 || 
|-
| Sukhoi T-4 || Soviet Union || Turbojet || Bomber || 1972 || Prototype || 1 || Strategic bomber
|-
| Tupolev Tu-22 || Soviet Union || Turbojet || Bomber || 1959 || Production || 311 || Strategic bomber
|-
| Tupolev Tu-22M || Soviet Union || Turbofan || Bomber || 1969 || Production || 497 || Strategic bomber
|-
| Tupolev Tu-28 || Soviet Union || Turbojet || Fighter|| 1961 || Production || 198 || Interceptor 
|-
| Tupolev Tu-144 || Soviet Union || Turbojet || Transport || 1968 || Production || 16 || SST
|-
| Tupolev Tu-160 || Soviet Union || Turbofan || Bomber || 1981 || Production || 36 || Strategic bomber
|-
| Vought F-8 Crusader || United States || Turbojet || Fighter || 1955 || Production || 1219 || 
|-
| Xian JH-7 || China || Turbofan || Multirole || 1988 || Production || 270 || 
|-
| Yakovlev Yak-27 || Soviet Union || Turbojet || Patrol || 1960 || Production || 165 || Reconnaissance
|-
| Yakovlev Yak-28 || Soviet Union || Turbojet || Multirole || 1958 || Production || 1180 || 
|-
| Yakovlev Yak-38 || Soviet Union || V/STOL || Fighter || 1971 || Production || 231 || 
|-
| Yakovlev Yak-141 || Soviet Union || V/STOL || Fighter || 1987 || Prototype || 4 ||
|}

See also 
 List of aircraft
 Supersonic aircraft
 Sound barrier
 Supersonic flight
 Compressible flow
 Hypersonic

References 
Bibliography
 

Lists of aircraft by design configuration